The Horezu is a left tributary of the river Geamărtălui in Romania. It discharges into the Geamărtălui in Broșteni. The following towns and villages are situated along the river, from source to mouth: Poienile, Înfrățirea, Săliște, Prejoi, Seculești, Gura Racului, Bulzești, Dobrețu, Horezu, Mardale and Broșteni.

References

Rivers of Romania
Rivers of Olt County
Rivers of Dolj County
Rivers of Vâlcea County